is a Japanese manga series by Takumi Ishida. Kakafukaka was serialized in the monthly  manga magazine Kiss from October 25, 2013 to November 25, 2020. A live-action television drama adaptation titled  was broadcast from April 25, 2019 to June 28, 2019 as part of MBS's  programming block.

Plot

Aki Terada, a young woman with no direction in her life, moves out of her apartment after breaking up with her cheating ex-boyfriend. When she moves into a sharehouse, she discovers that one of her new roommates is Tomoya Hongyo, a novelist and her first boyfriend from middle school. Hongyo reveals that he has erectile dysfunction for the past two years but discovers that close proximity with Aki has caused his condition to get better. Deciding to test this further, he asks Aki to sleep with him in his bed, but their relationship begins to escalate the closer they get.

Characters

Aki is a 24-year-old freeter with no direction in her life. She moves into a sharehouse after leaving her ex-boyfriend.

Hongyo is a novelist and Aki's boyfriend from middle school. He reveals to Aki that he has erectile dysfunction since two years ago, but he realizes that being physically close to her makes his condition better, and, as a result, asks her to sleep in his bed with him.

Hase is the owner of the sharehouse. He is Hongyo's former editor. Despite not having genuine interest in marriage nor romance, he proposes to Aki out of his parents pressuring him to get married, initially because of their compatible lifestyles. He eventually comes to love Aki for real. His distorted views of love came from his strained relationship with his mother and he is easily repulsed by women who get too physically close to him.

Akari is a woman living at the sharehouse who works at a design company. She is a fan of Hongyo.

Media

Manga

Kakafukaka is written and illustrated by Takumi Ishida. It was serialized in the monthly manga magazine Kiss beginning in the December 2013 issue released on October 25, 2013 to the January 2021 issue released on November 25, 2020. The chapters were later released in twelve bound volumes by Kodansha under the Kiss Comics imprint.

Ishida had created the series to challenge the ideas of traditional love, as  manga typically valued emotional aspects of love over physical aspects. In doing so, she placed equal focus on both aspects of love, claiming that they were "connected."

In 2018, Kodansha USA announced that they had licensed the series in English for North American distribution, with the volumes distributed digitally.

Television drama

A live-action television series adaptation titled  was announced on March 24, 2019. The series aired on April 25, 2019 on MBS as the flagship show of their new  programming block, with other broadcasts on TV Kanagawa, Television Saitama, and Amazon Prime Video. The series is directed by Momoko Fukuda, with Kumiko Asō in charge of the script. The opening theme song is "Like That!!" by lol. The ending theme song is "Suki da yo (My Love)" by BoA.

Reception

In 2019, Kakafukaka had sold a consecutive total of 1.7 million physical copies. It was selected as one of the recommended  manga by an editor of Cheese! at the Shōjo Manga Fes 2018.

References

External links 
 
  of the TV drama 

2019 Japanese television series debuts
Japanese television dramas based on manga
Josei manga
Kodansha manga